Guinevere Alice Mei-Ing Kauffmann was  born in California. She is an astrophysicist and is known for her work studying galaxies among other subjects.

Academic career
Kauffmann obtained a B.Sc.(Hons) in applied mathematics at the University of Cape Town in 1988 and an M.Sc. in astronomy in 1990.  She obtained her Ph.D. in astronomy at the University of Cambridge in 1993, working with Simon White, whom she later married.

She was a member of the Miller Research Fellows program at the University of California, Berkeley, and was then employed  as a postdoc at the Max Planck Institute for Extraterrestrial Physics and the Max Planck Institute for Astrophysics in Garching, Germany. She became head of a research team at the Max Planck Institute for Astrophysics in 2003. As of 2013, she is one of the directors of the Max Planck Institute for Astrophysics.

Her areas of research interest include  models of galaxy formation; analysis of observed properties of galaxies, including their atomic and molecular gas; active galactic nuclei; and the Sloan Digital Sky Survey.

Kauffmann has coordinated a Marie Curie Research Training Network of the European Union that brought together researchers from all over Europe for interdisciplinary projects.

Awards
 In 1997, Guinevere Kauffmann received the Otto Hahn Medal.
 In 2002, she received the Heinz Maier-Leibnitz-Preis.
 In 2007, she received the Gottfried Wilhelm Leibniz Prize of the Deutsche Forschungsgemeinschaft, which is the highest honour awarded in German research.
 In 2009, she was elected to the American Academy of Arts and Sciences.
 In April 2010, she was awarded with the Order of Merit of the Federal Republic of Germany, with the Cross of Merit (on ribbon) and the certificate in the name of the German President. The award ceremony was carried out by Bavarian Prime Minister Horst Seehofer on 21 April 2010.
 In 2010, she was elected to the German Academy of Sciences Leopoldina.
 In 2012, she was elected to the National Academy of Sciences of the US.

Bullying allegations 

In February 2018, the German news magazine Spiegel Online published an article about abuse of power by senior scientists at the MPI for Astrophysics. 
Several emails obtained by BuzzFeed News Germany revealed in June 2018 that the allegations concerned MPA director Guinevere Kauffmann, who was accused of harassing and bullying students and scientists for years. Leaked emails published by BuzzFeed News Germany also include what has been described as racist, sexist and homophobic statements directed at employees and students. Responding to questions by the journal Nature, Kauffmann denied the accusations of racism, sexism and homophobia, claiming that she is merely interested in cultural differences between people and Buzzfeed had made severe errors. She conceded that as a student she was subject to "very high pressure supervision", acknowledging however that such a mentoring style "has now become unacceptable" and claiming to have changed her behavior substantially after complaints were received. 
This and other cases  sparked a general debate about the abuse of power in science. 

In August 2018, Science Magazine reported allegations of bullying and sexual harassment at the MPI for Astrophysics in Garching and reported that Kauffmann had been accused of bullying, was receiving coaching and daily monitoring, and had been given a drastically reduced group to lead. In an interview with the German newspaper Frankfurter Allgemeine Zeitung, the director of the MPI admitted that the scandal had shown deficiencies in and the need for improvement of the MPI's procedures for dealing with complaints.

Selected publications 
 
 
 
 .

References

Sources
 Portrait at the Deutsche Forschungsgemeinschaft
 CV

External links
 

1968 births
Living people
Science teachers
20th-century German astronomers
Gottfried Wilhelm Leibniz Prize winners
University of Cape Town alumni
Alumni of the University of Cambridge
Max Planck Society people
Recipients of the Cross of the Order of Merit of the Federal Republic of Germany
Members of the United States National Academy of Sciences
Fellows of the American Academy of Arts and Sciences
American expatriates in Germany
Scientists from California
21st-century German astronomers